It's Polka Time is an American musical television series broadcast by ABC from July 1956 to September 1957.

Also known as simply Polka Time, the program featured authentic polka music, performed in Chicago, Illinois, primarily by authentic Polish-Americans.  Chief among the regular performers seen were:

Bruno "Junior" Zielinski
Carolyn DeZuirk
Richard (Hodyl) and Mildred (Lawnik)
Wally Moore and Chick Hurt
Irene Grodzki (formally Gorecki)
Rusty Gill
Stan Wolowic's Polka Chips
The “It’s Polka Time” TV Show with Stan Wolowic and the Polka Chips  began in the summer of 1956.  The band included in addition to Stan Wolowic on accordion, Wally Moore, banjo, Tommy Thomas, drums, Jack Cordaro, clarinet, Chick Hurt, Banjo, Jack Taylor Bass. Rusty Gill was featured on vocals and guitar, his wife Carolyn DeZurik was also featured on vocals and yodeling.   Most of these guys were in a group called the Kentucky Ramblers, this group moved to Chicago in the 1930s and joined the WLS staff and became the Prairie Ramblers, before becoming the “Chips”.  They claim that Wally Moore wrote lyrics for all of the Polka Chips songs. The Show was on from July 1956 to September 1957.
It was produced at WBKB's 190 North State St. studios and broadcast locally over WBKB Channel 7 and nationally over the ABC Network.

References
Brooks, Tim and Marsh, Earle, The Complete Directory to Prime Time Network and Cable TV Shows, 1946-Present

External links

1950s American music television series
1956 American television series debuts
1957 American television series endings
American Broadcasting Company original programming
Black-and-white American television shows
Chicago television shows